Piotr Zajączkowski (born 8 March 1966) is a Polish football player and manager.

References

1966 births
Living people
People from Lidzbark County
Polish footballers
Association football midfielders
Olimpia Elbląg players
Jeziorak Iława players
Broń Radom players
Jagiellonia Białystok players
OKS Stomil Olsztyn players
Ceramika Opoczno players
Śląsk Wrocław players
FF Jaro players
Świt Nowy Dwór Mazowiecki players
Vaasan Palloseura players
Siarka Tarnobrzeg players
Chojniczanka Chojnice players
Warmia Grajewo players
Ekstraklasa players
I liga players
Polish expatriate footballers
Expatriate footballers in Finland
Polish expatriate sportspeople in Finland
Polish football managers
Tur Turek managers
Jeziorak Iława managers
ŁKS Łódź managers
Olimpia Zambrów managers
OKS Stomil Olsztyn managers
I liga managers
II liga managers